George Murray may refer to:

Arts 
George Murray (musician), bass guitarist
George Murray (poet) (born 1971), Canadian poet

Military 
Lord George Murray (general) (1694–1760), Jacobite general
George Murray, 6th Lord Elibank (died 1785), British naval officer
George Murray (Royal Navy officer, born 1741) (1741–1797), Royal Navy officer and MP for Perth Burghs
George Murray (Royal Navy officer, born 1759) (1759–1819), Royal Navy admiral
George Murray (British Army officer) (1772–1846), lieutenant-governor of Upper Canada
George Poultney Malcolm Murray (1837–1910), officer in the paramilitary Native Police of Queensland
George D. Murray (1889–1956), American admiral in World War II

Politics 
George Murray, 5th Earl of Dunmore (1762–1836), Scottish politician and peer
George Crawford Murray (1827–1884), New Jersey state legislator
George Murray (Nova Scotia politician) (1828–1888), physician and politician in Nova Scotia, Canada
George W. Murray (1853–1926), US Congressman from South Carolina
George Henry Murray (1861–1929), Premier of Nova Scotia
George Matheson Murray (1889–1961), Canadian editor, journalist and politician
George Belcher Murray (1895–1941), politician from Nova Scotia, Canada

Religion 
Lord George Murray (bishop) (1761–1803), bishop of St David's, grandson of the general
George Murray (bishop of Rochester) (1784–1860), bishop of Sodor and Man, 1814–1827, and Rochester, 1827–1860, son of the bishop of St David's
George M. Murray (bishop) (1919–2006), bishop of the Episcopal Church in the United States

Sports 
George Murray (baseball) (1898–1955), former pitcher, nicknamed "Smiler"
George Murray (cricketer) (born 1940), Australian cricketer
George Murray (footballer) (born 1942), Scottish footballer
George Murray (golfer) (born 1983), Scottish professional golfer
George Murray (rugby union), Scottish rugby player

Academics 
George Murray (naturalist) (1858–1911), Scottish botanist
Gilbert Murray (George Gilbert Aime Murray, 1866–1957), British classical scholar
George M. Murray (scientist) (born 1953), chemistry and material science academic

Other people
George Murray, 6th Duke of Atholl (1814–1864), Scottish peer who formed the Atholl Highlanders
Sir George Murray (civil servant) (1849–1936), British civil servant
George Redmayne Murray (1865–1939), British physician
George Murray (engineer) (1859–1947), New Zealand civil engineer and surveyor
George John Robert Murray (1863–1942), Chief Justice of South Australia
George Iain Murray, 10th Duke of Atholl (1931–1996), Scottish peer and forestry expert

Fictional characters
George Murray, a character in Actor's and Sin

See also
George V. Murry (1948–2020), American bishop